, sometimes credited as Harry Hosono, is a Japanese musician, singer, songwriter and record producer. He is considered to be one of the most influential musicians in Japanese pop music history, credited with shaping the sound of Japanese pop for decades as well as pop music outside of Japan. He also inspired genres such as city pop and Shibuya-kei, and as leader of Yellow Magic Orchestra, contributed to the development and pioneering of numerous electronic genres.

The grandson of Titanic survivor Masabumi Hosono, Haruomi began his career with the psychedelic rock band Apryl Fool, before achieving recognition both nationally and internationally, as a founding member of the bands Happy End and Yellow Magic Orchestra. Hosono has also released many solo albums covering a variety of styles, including film soundtracks and a variety of electronic ambient albums. As well as recording his own music, Hosono has done considerable production work for other artists such as Miharu Koshi, Sheena and the Roketts, Sandii & the Sunsetz, Chisato Moritaka and Seiko Matsuda. In 2003, Hosono was ranked by HMV Japan at number 44 on their list of the top 100 Japanese pop acts of all time.

Biography

Hosono is the grandson of Masabumi Hosono, the only Japanese passenger and survivor of the sinking of RMS Titanic. Hosono first came to attention in Japan as the bass player of the psychedelic rock band Apryl Fool, alongside drummer Takashi Matsumoto, who released the album The Apryl Fool in 1969. Hosono and Matsumoto then formed the influential folk rock group Happy End with Eiichi Ohtaki and Shigeru Suzuki. One of the songs he composed for Happy End, "Kaze wo Atsumete" (1971), later appeared in the American film Lost in Translation and on its soundtrack in 2003. After Happy End disbanded around 1974, Hosono worked with Suzuki and a loose association of artists making "exotica"-style music under the title Tin Pan Alley.

His involvement in electronic music also dates back to the early 1970s, when he performed the electric bass for Inoue Yousui's folk pop rock album Ice World (1973) and Osamu Kitajima's progressive/psychedelic rock album Benzaiten (1974), both of which were electronic rock records utilizing synthesizers, electric guitars, and in the latter, electronic drums and rhythm machines.

In 1977, Hosono invited Ryuichi Sakamoto and Yukihiro Takahashi to work on his exotica-flavoured album Paraiso, which included electronic music produced using the Yamaha CS-80 polyphonic synthesizer and ARP Odyssey synthesizer. The band was named "Harry Hosono and the Yellow Magic Band" and, having been recorded in late 1977, Paraiso was released in early 1978. The three worked together again for the 1978 electronic album Pacific, which included an early version of the song "Cosmic Surfin'".

In 1978, he released an innovative electronic soundtrack for a fictional Bollywood film, Cochin Moon, together with artist Tadanori Yokoo and future YMO band members Ryuichi Sakamoto and Hideki Matsutake. Inspired by a trip to India and "the exotic, luxurious, and seemingly wonder-filled scenarios played out in Indian cinemas", it was an experimental "electro-exotica" album fusing exotic Indian music (reminiscent of Ravi Shankar and Bollywood music) with electronic music, including an early "synth raga" song entitled "Hum Ghar Sajan" (from a Guru Granth Sahib phrase). The same year, he contributed to Sakamoto's song "1000 Knives" for his solo album, Thousand Knives, which experimented with fusing electronic music with traditional Japanese music in early 1978.

He was one of the first producers to recognize the appeal of video game sounds and music. YMO's self-titled debut in 1978 contained substantial video game sounds and after YMO disbanded an early project was an album simply titled Video Game Music containing mixed and edited Namco arcade game music and sounds. Video Game Music was released in 1984 as an early example of a chiptune record and the first video game music album. That same year, he also produced the theme song for Hayao Miyazaki's popular anime film Nausicaä of the Valley of the Wind, "Kaze no Tani no Naushika", with vocals by actress-singer Narumi Yasuda. In the late 80s and early 90s, the influence of world music on his music deepened, and he worked with international singers and musicians such as Amina Annabi.

He has produced a number of short-term band projects as a band member. His first post-YMO band was Friends of Earth. As with most of his projects he combines musical styles he's interested in. F.O.E. seemed to be a combination of funk and techno, and included a collaboration with James Brown and Maceo Parker for a remake of the song "Sex Machine". Another notable band project was 1995's Love, Peace & Trance. Members were Mimori Yusa ("Love"), Miyako Koda ("Peace"), Haruomi Hosono ("&") and Mishio Ogawa ("Trance").

In the 1990s he started the Daisyworld label to release a wide range of experimental artists from Japan and the rest of the world. Hosono collaborated on many of the releases, such as World Standard, a trip into Americana; HAT, a supergroup (the acronym stands for Hosono, Atom Heart, Tetsu Inoue), and "Quiet Logic", by Mixmaster Morris and Jonah Sharp. The Orb also paid tribute with a series of remixes including the notorious "Hope You Choke on Your Whalemeat".

In 2002 Haruomi formed the duo Sketch Show with his YMO bandmate Yukihiro Takahashi. They have released two albums, one of which, Loophole, has received a UK release. When the third former YMO member, Ryuichi Sakamoto deepened his involvement it was decided to bill those collaborations as Human Audio Sponge.

In the spring of 2007, his fellow YMO members and other artist paid tribute to Haruomi with a 2-disc album titled Tribute to Haruomi. That same year, the animated film Appleseed Ex Machina was released featuring a soundtrack performed and supervised by Hosono.

In September 2010 he performed at the De La Fantasia festival and played songs from his upcoming album.

In February 2011 it was announced that his new album, entitled HoSoNoVa, was to be released on April 20. He also performed a special concert to celebrate its release. 

In May 2018, Light in the Attic Records announced a CD and vinyl reissue of five of Hosono's albums—Hosono House, Cochin Moon, Paraiso, Philharmony and omni Sight Seeing—for release in August and September 2018.  The former four albums had never been released outside of Japan previously.  Coinciding was the announcement that Hosono would play his first UK concerts as a solo artist in June; the shows were scheduled as part of Sakamoto's MODE festival happening throughout England in June and July. The June 23 concert at the Barbican Centre in London featured an appearance by his YMO bandmates, with whom he performed his Solid State Survivor composition "Absolute Ego Dance".

2019 marked Hosono's 50th anniversary in the music industry. On March 6, he released Hochono House, a mostly electronic remake of his solo debut Hosono House that reversed the track listing. That spring, he performed his first solo shows in the U.S. This run included two sold-out shows at the Gramercy Theatre in New York City and a concert at the Mayan Theater in Los Angeles. The second New York show saw an appearance by current NYC resident Akiko Yano, who collaborated with Hosono in Tin Pan Alley, as a live support member of YMO, and as a solo artist; she sang Hosono's "Ai Ai Gasa", which she covered on her 1977 album Iroha Ni Konpeitou. In LA, Canadian indie rock musician Mac DeMarco—whose vocal admiration of Hosono has spread to a portion of his own fanbase—appeared during the show to perform "Honey Moon" as a duet with Hosono; Light in the Attic had recently released a cover of the song on a 7" single record, backed with the original version.

In the autumn of 2019, an exhibition on Hosono's career—"Hosono Sightseeing"—was on display in Tokyo Sky View at the Roppongi Hills Mori Tower; along with other memorabilia, this featured many of the instruments associated with Hosono, such as the Roland TR-808, E-mu Emulator, and Prophet-5. A documentary film, No Smoking, was also released, including footage from the U.S. and UK shows; appearances include Sakamoto, Takahashi, Demarco, longtime friend Van Dyke Parks, and protégé Gen Hoshino.

Bands and collaborations
 Apryl Fool
 Happy End
 Tin Pan Alley
 Yellow Magic Orchestra
 Friends of Earth (F.O.E) (with Eiki Nonaka)
 HIS (with Kiyoshirō Imawano and Fuyumi Sakamoto)
 Testpattern (with Yukihiro Takahashi, Fumio Ichimura, and Masao Hiruma)
 Love, Peace & Trance (Mimori Yusa, Miyako Koda and Mishio Ogawa)
 Swing Slow (with Miharu Koshi)
 HAT (with Atom Heart and Tetsu Inoue)
 Harry & Mac (with Makoto Kubota)
 Tin Pan (with Tatsuo Hayashi and Shigeru Suzuki)
 Sketch Show (with Yukihiro Takahashi)
 HASYMO (previously Human Audio Sponge) (Sketch Show and Ryuichi Sakamoto, with Keigo Oyamada, Hiroshi Takano, Christian Fennesz, Tomohiko Gondō and Ren Takada as live support)

Discography

Albums 
Hosono House (1973)
Tropical Dandy (1975, as Haruomi "Hosono")
 (1976, as Harry "The Crown" Hosono)
 (1978, by "Harry Hosono and The Yellow Magic Band")
 (1978, by "Hosono & Yokoo")
Philharmony (1982)
 (1984, cassette book)Making of Non-Standard Music/Making of Monad Music (1984)S-F-X (1984, by "Haruomi Hosono with Friends of Earth")Mercuric Dance (1985)Endless Talking (1985)Omni Sight Seeing (1989)Medicine Compilation (1993)Mental Sports Mixes (1993)Good Sport (1995)Naga (1995)N.D.E. ("Near Death Experience") (1995)Interpieces Organization (1996, by Haruomi Hosono & Bill Laswell)
 (1999, with Makoto Kubota as "Harry & Mac")Flying Saucer 1947 (2007, by "Harry Hosono & The World Shyness")HoSoNoVa (2011)Heavenly Music (2013)Vu Ja De (2017)Hochono House (2019) Hosono Haruomi Live in US 2019 (2021)

Soundtrack albums
 Video Game Music (1984, songs from Namco games arranged and produced by Hosono)
  (1984, anime soundtrack, only produced theme song sung by Narumi Yasuda)Coincidental Music (1985, compilation of assorted background music/soundtrack commissions)
  (1985, movie soundtrack)
 Paradise View (1985, movie soundtrack)
  (1987, movie soundtrack)
  (1996, background music for and included with the Taro Manabe picture book of the same name)
 La Maison de Himiko (2005, movie soundtrack)
 Ex Machina Original Soundtrack/Original Soundtrack Complete Edition (2007, soundtrack supervention, composition of some tracks)
 Shoplifters (2018) Original Soundtrack

Compilation albums
 Hosono Box 1969–2000 (2000, Daisyworld)
 Harry Hosono Crown Years 1974–1977 (2007)

Tribute albums
 Tribute to Haruomi Hosono (2007, Commmons)
Featuring: Van Dyke Parks, Ryuichi Sakamoto, Takako Minekawa, Miharu Koshi, Little Creatures, Tokyo Ska Paradise Orchestra, Hiroshi Takano, Towa Tei, Akiko Yano, Rei Harakami, Yukihiro Takahashi, Cornelius, Jim O'Rourke, Kahimi Karie

 Strange Song Book – Tribute to Haruomi Hosono 2 (2008, Commmons)
Featuring: Señor Coconut, Van Dyke Parks, Dr. John, Sheena & The Rokkets, Buffalo Daughter, Thurston Moore, Miu Sakamoto, Ryuichi Sakamoto, Fennesz

Contributions
 CBS/Sony Sound Image Series:
Pacific (with Shigeru Suzuki and Tatsuro Yamashita) (tracks 1, 4 and 8 composed and performed by Hosono) (1978)
The Aegean Sea (with Masataka Matsutoya and Takahiko Ishikawa) (tracks 3 and 4 composed and performed by Hosono) (1979)
Vol. 1 – Island Music (with Suzuki, Yamashita, Matsutoya, Ishikawa and Ryuichi Sakamoto) (tracks 1, 7, 9 and 10 composed and performed by Hosono) (1983)
Vol. 2 – Off Shore (Suzuki, Yamashita, Matsutoya, Sakamoto, Masaki Matsubara and Kazumasa Akiyama) (tracks 1 and 2 composed and performed by Hosono) (1983)Melon Brains (1994)Goku (1995)
 Love, Peace & Trance (1995)Lattice (2000)

Composition work

 :
High School Lullaby (ハイスクールララバイ) (1981)
 (1982)
 Miki Fujimura:
仏蘭西映画
夢・恋・人 (1983)
妖星傅
春 Mon Amour
 Yoshie Kashiwabara:  (1982)
 Starbow:  (1982)
 Kumiko Yamashita: 
赤道小町ドキッ (1982)
Teenage Eagles (1983)
 Kawakamisan to Nagashimasan: きたかチョーさんまってたドン (1983)
 Miki Matsubara:  (1983)
 Seiko Matsuda:
 (1983)
 (1983)
 (1984)
 Shin'ichi Mori:
 (1983)

 Akina Nakamori:  (1983)
 Apogee & Perigee (Jun Togawa, Yuji Miyake and other artists):
 (1984, Alfa)
 (1984, Alfa)
 Jun Togawa: 玉姫様 (1984)
 Narumi Yasuda:  (image song for the film) (1984)
 "NHK News Today" opening theme (1988, NHK TV)
 Chisato Moritaka: 
 (1997, zetima)
 – Writing, Performance, Production (1998, zetima)
 Chappie:  (1999)
 Kuniko Yamada: 
 Masatō Ibu: 

Filmography
Music
 Evening Primrose (1974)
 Summer Secret (1982)
 Night on the Galactic Railroad (1985)
 Paradise View (1985)
 A Promise (1986)
 Jazz Daimyō (1986)
 Murasaki SHikubu-Genji Monogatari (1987)
 Hoshi wo Tsugumono (1990)
 Southern Winds (1993)
 On the Way (2000)
 House of Himiko (2005)
 Appleseed Ex Machina (2007, Music supervising director)
 Shoplifters (2018)

Acting
 Izakaya Chōji (1983)
 A Y.M.O. Film Propaganda (1984)
 Paradise view (1985)
 Shigatsu no Sakana (1985)
 Binetsu Shōnen (1987)
 Norwegian Wood (2010): Record Shop Manager
 Isle of Dogs (2018): Scrap (japanese dub)
 They Say Nothing Stays the Same (2019)
 Bullets, Bones and Blocked Noses (2021, TV miniseries): Barber

Documentary appearance
 No Smoking'' (2019)

Related books

References

External links 

Haruomi Hosono discography, news, and general information at Music City
Official Sketch Show website (Avex) 
Nippop Profile | Sketch Show

1947 births
20th-century Japanese male musicians
21st-century Japanese male musicians
Asian Film Award winners
Happy End (band) members
Japanese bass guitarists
Japanese dance musicians
Japanese electro musicians
Japanese electronic musicians
Japanese film score composers
Japanese house musicians
Japanese male film score composers
Japanese male singer-songwriters
Japanese multi-instrumentalists
Japanese record producers
Japanese singer-songwriters
Japanese techno musicians
Japanese trance musicians
Living people
Male bass guitarists
Singers from Tokyo
Rikkyo University alumni
Video game musicians
Yellow Magic Orchestra members